Child prodigies and children who have exceptional talents frequently figure in entertainment media. This article indicates some examples of characters cited as child prodigies in such media.

In comics
 Adhemar, son of Nero in the eponymous Belgian comic strip series The Adventures of Nero is a five year old who is so intelligent that he teaches at both the University of Oxford and University of Cambridge. He has his own laboratory in Kobbegem and invents numerous new inventions, including rockets, medicines, robots, and atomic formulae.
 Dilton Doiley from the Archie comic book series is the smartest teenager in Riverdale and is an amateur inventor.
 Génial Olivier, the main protagonist of the eponymous Belgian comic strip series by Jacques Devos is a boy genius whose inventions drive the plot of many of his stories.
Itachi Uchiha, Sasuke's older brother and character in the manga and anime series Naruto, is considered a genius by the Uchiha Clan.
Kakashi Hatake, introduced as the trainer of Naruto, Sakura, and Sasuke, was a child prodigy who graduated the ninja academy at age 5, becoming a full-fledged ninja at age 12.
Minato Namikaze, Naruto's father and the Fourth Hokage was recognised as a prodigy. 
Chiyo Mihama, a character in the manga and anime series Azumanga Daioh, is a prodigy who is allowed to skip several grades and attend high school at age 10. 
Urumi Kanzaki, a character in the manga and anime series Great Teacher Onizuka, is a prodigy with an IQ over 200, can speak 5 languages, and was able to do differential calculus in elementary school. 
In the manga and anime Fullmetal Alchemist, both Edward Elric and Winry Rockbell are noted as being child prodigies, Edward for performing advanced alchemy at age 11, and Winry for becoming a skilled automail (cybernetic prosthetics) mechanic at the same age. Edward's brother Alphonse also performed the same alchemy with Ed at age 10, but most people who don't know him well don't realize that he's a child.
In the manga and both anime series of Sailor Moon, fifteen-year-old Hotaru Tomoe shows signs of a girl prodigy at the young age of four, being the lookalike reincarnation of Sailor Saturn herself, who has transferred some of her powers to her host since their rebirth. 
In the manga and anime series Nichijou, the character Hakase Shinonome (literally "Professor Shinonome") is a child genius who created a robot (Nano Shinonome) at age 7, but otherwise acts like any other child.
In the Brazilian comic franchise Monica's Gang, Franklin (Franjinha) is a 10-year-old child scientist who owns his own laboratory and is frequently creating new machines and formulas that almost always fall into the hands of his friends causing trouble.

In literature
 In the 1988 novel Matilda by Roald Dahl, the eponymous Matilda Wormwood, is, according to the BBC News, "a child prodigy who [is] unloved by her parents."
 In Evil Genius, Genius Squad, and Genius Wars by Catherine Jinks, Cadel Piggot is a child genius who enrolls in a "University of Evil".
 In the 1985 novel Ender's Game, Andrew "Ender" Wiggin, Bean, Petra Arkanian, and a group of also exceptionally talented child geniuses known as "Ender's jeesh" are recruited by an organization known as the International Fleet in order to unknowingly command fleets against an alien species to save the Earth.
 In the series Artemis Fowl of books by Eoin Colfer, Artemis Fowl II starts as a 12-year-old child prodigy and ages throughout the series.
 In the works of J. D. Salinger (Nine Stories, Franny and Zooey, Raise High the Roof Beam, Carpenters and Seymour: An Introduction), the children in the Glass family are considered to be child prodigies. All seven children appeared on the radio quiz show "It's a Wise Child."
 In Harry Potter, Severus Snape is described as a former child prodigy who, as a bullied teenager, briefly sides with series antagonist Voldemort. 
Lord Voldemort, the most powerful sorcerer in the Harry Potter universe, second to Albus Dumbledore. He was the most brilliant student who ever went to Hogwarts. 
 In the Legend trilogy written by Marie Lu, June Iparis is described as a child prodigy, having scored full on her Republic's Trial.
 In Genius: The Game, Rex, a genius programmer and hacker, Tunde, engineer who created his small Nigerian village's solar power tower, and Cai, a blogger who is a master of disguise, set to expose underhand Chinese government deals, are all kids under eighteen invited to participate in 'THE GAME', where 200 of the world's brightest minds will face challenges set by Kiran Biswes, the young CEO of a company named "OndScan".
In the series The Mysterious Benedict Society, the main characters Reynie Muldoon, George "Sticky" Washington, Kate Wetherall, and Constance Contraire have been described as child prodigies.
In The School for Gifted Potentials series, Everett is identified as highly gifted despite purposely scoring low on the entrance test. Students either enroll in the school from birth by gifted parents or are invited by “Observers”.
High School Prodigies Have It Easy Even In Another World is light novel also developed into a manga and an anime, about seven child prodigies sent to a fantasy world.

In films
 Will from Good Will Hunting played by Matt Damon.
 Billy Elliot in Billy Elliot (2000), a dance prodigy.
 Anakin Skywalker, in The Phantom Menace (1999), features the 9-year-old boy who is a brilliant pilot, technician, mechanic and engineer. He later becomes a member of the elite Jedi Knights, but clashes with authority and falls to the dark side of the Force, eventually becoming Darth Vader in Revenge of the Sith.
 Harold Wormser, Revenge of the Nerds (1984). A twelve-year-old child prodigy in the first film, reluctantly went into college by his parents at first, but was accepted among his fellow misfits and was helpful in many of their capers against the rival campus jocks that bullied them in the film series.
Dade Murphy, Hackers (1995). He hacked and crashed exactly 1,507 systems of the New York Stock Exchange at the age of 11.
 Tony Stark, Iron Man (2008). He built his first circuit board at age 6, his first engine (a V8) at 8 and graduated summa cum laude from the Massachusetts Institute of Technology (MIT) at 17.
 Fred Tate, Little Man Tate (1991). A particularly clever young boy suffers from burnout.
 Stanley Spector, Magnolia (1999). The character is an eminent contestant on the quiz show What Do Kids Know? His greedy father capitalizes off of his son's success and constantly pressures him to win. The emotional distress that this pressure, along with alienation from society caused by being perceived as an amusing object, eventually becomes evident.
 The Royal Tenenbaums (2001) concerns "a family composed of three child prodigies".
 Jamal Wallace, Finding Forrester (2000), is a genius teenager.
 August in August Rush (2007) possesses a deep understanding of the concept of music and a musical talent far exceeding his adult peers, including his parents. In the film, he is capable of creating, mastering, and performing his own symphony in front of thousands.
 Nathan in A Brilliant Young Mind (2014) is a mathematical prodigy. Comprehending to love as imaginary, he ignores initially his mother's caring behaviour. When he falls in love, he understands that love is not bound to any formula.
Hiro Hamada in Big Hero 6 (2014) is a robotics genius that graduated from high school early, and was admitted to university at the San Fransokyo Institute of Technology at the age of 14.
Mary Adler (played by Mckenna Grace) in Gifted (2017) is a mathematical prodigy whose late mother was a mathematician. She expressed an interest in solving the Navier-Stokes existence and smoothness problem which her mother was working on.
 Lynn in Bad Genius (2017) is a straight-A student who accepted into a prestigious school, was devises an exams-cheating scheme which eventually rises to international levels.

In television
 In The Sarah Jane Adventures, Sarah Jane's adopted son Luke is a child prodigy with the ability to remember numbers with over 20 digits after only a glance beforehand.
In Code Lyoko, Jeremy Belpois is a child genius and an expert in quantum physics and science. At 11, he builds a time machine and could create a materialization program that teleports humans into a virtual plane. It is also shown that he can easily create a clone of himself and his friends, and knows Morse code. Aelita, who was believed to be a humanoid virtual being, is exceptionally gifted due to being the daughter of computer scientist Franz Hopper, the creator of the quantum supercomputer, the virtual world Lyoko, and X.A.N.A. himself. 
In Code Lyoko: Evolution, Jeremie Belpois seems to have met his match with the appearance of girl-genius Laura Gauthier. 
 In Family Guy, Stewie Griffin is portrayed as a child prodigy already as a baby.
 In Smart Guy, T.J Henderson (played by Tahj Mowry) skips 6 grades and goes straight from 4th grade to 10th grade. T.J deals with the trial and tribulations of a kid in high school. He joins his 16-year-old brother Marcus (played by Jason Weaver) and his friend Mo (played by Omar Gooding).
 In The Big Bang Theory, Sheldon Cooper (played by Jim Parsons) has an IQ of 187 and an eidetic memory. He went to college when he was 11 and received his Ph.D. when he was 16. When he was 14, Sheldon tested out lasers and the college teacher who saw was shushed by the government. Also, in the episode "The Jerusalem Duality", Dennis Kim, a 15-year-old physics child prodigy appears and clashes with Sheldon when the former excels the latter in every way. In the prequel spin-off series, Young Sheldon, Sheldon Cooper (Iain Armitage) met another precocious but troubled child named Paige Swanson (Mckenna Grace). Sheldon also got admitted into the California Institute of Technology.
 In CSI, there are two episodes (The Unusual Suspect and Goodbye and Good Luck) where the character of Hannah West, a 12-year-old child prodigy, appears. In the first episode, she was in senior year in high school, and in the second (two years later), she was already a teacher's assistant in college.
 In Breakout Kings, Lloyd Lowery (Jimmi Simpson) is a former child prodigy who graduated high school at 12, college at 16, and medical school at 20. He has an IQ of 210.
 In Doogie Howser, M.D., the title character is a child prodigy who has graduated from medical school and practices medicine.
 In the television show Firefly, the character of River Tam (played by Summer Glau) is shown as a prodigy throughout the show, having started to correct her elder brother's spelling at an early age, as well as seeing flaws and "fallacious conclusions" in one of his textbooks. She is also able of feats such as calculating in her head a course for the show's spaceship destination.
 In the television show Heroes, Micah Sanders is a computer hacker who is a child prodigy.
 In the television show Criminal Minds, one of the main characters, the socially awkward Spencer Reid (played by Matthew Gray Gubler) is a former child prodigy who has an IQ of 187, an eidetic memory, and can read 20,000 words per minute. He graduated from high school at the age of 12, and between the ages of 16 and 21, he received three doctorates (mathematics, chemistry, and engineering), and two bachelor's degrees (psychology, and sociology). He joined the BAU at 22, and currently works on a team who catch criminals through behavioral profiling. He has shown hints of schizophrenia, and is speculated of having Asperger's Syndrome.
 In the television show </Scorpion>, Elyes Gabel plays wunderkind and boy genius, Walter O'Brien, inspired by the real-life genius, Walter O'Brien.
 In the TV show Numb3rs, one of the main characters, Charlie Eppes (played by David Krumholtz), is a child prodigy. At the age of three he was multiplying four digit numbers in his head. At age 13 he started attending Princeton University and graduated at age 16. He now helps his brother Don solve cases for the FBI.
 In the TV series The Pretender (1996–2000), the main character, Jarod, is a former child prodigy who, as an adult, is capable of emulating any person within various fields of work or situations with only a minimal amount of research.
 In Star Trek: The Next Generation, Wesley Crusher was a child prodigy who was not well received by fans of the show.
 In the TV series Buck Rogers in the 25th Century, the 11-year-old Gary Coleman of Diff'rent Strokes plays genius Hieronymus Fox.
In the TV series 227,  Countess Vaughn plays the Jenkins' houseguest Alexanderia Dewitt, an 11-year-old child prodigy with an I.Q. of 195 and a college freshman.
 In seaQuest DSV, Lucas Wolenczak is a child prodigy who graduated from Stanford magna cum laude with a degree in Applied Principles of Artificial Intelligence. He left Stanford in the middle of his Ph.D. to become a member of the science crew aboard seaQuest at 16. His GPA record was never broken, even after 15-plus years.
 In The Adventures of Jimmy Neutron: Boy Genius, the titular character is a fifth grader whose IQ is off the charts, and, in one episode, went to college at age ten.
 In Max Headroom, Bryce Lynch is the 16-year-old techno-wiz who runs the Research and Development department at Network 23. Not only did he create Max himself out the mind of reporter Edison Carter, but he is credited in the film book of the original movie as being the one responsible for Network 23's rise to power.
 In The Loud House, Lisa Loud is the four-year-old child prodigy of the Loud family who speaks in scientific terms.
 In Mr. Young, Adam Young is a 14-year-old high school science teacher who attended college at age 9.
 In The Simpsons, Lisa Simpson is an 8-year-old girl who excels at academics, and music, particularly jazz.
 In Dexter's Laboratory, Dexter is a boy genius with a secret laboratory who went to college at 10 years of age.
 In Johnny Test, identical redheaded twins Susan and Mary Test are 13-year-old girl geniuses.
In PAW Patrol, Ryder builds the team's technology, including the Pup Packs, Vehicles, etc. at 10 years of age
In Your Lie in April Kousei Arima performs as a piano player with an orchestra when 8 years old
Doogie Kameāloha, M.D.
In Dinosaur King, the siblings Rod and Laura are the grandchildren of the evil genius Dr. Z. They show high knowledge in studies and also the ability to control devices better than people older than them.
In Digimon Adventure 02, Ken Ichijouji proves to be a child prodigy with a high intelligence. Koushiro Izumi in Digimon Adventure also demonstrates a fairly high intellect to handle computers.
In MegaMan NT Warrior, Yai Ayanokoj is a rich girl with high intellect, even studying in the same class as Lan and his friends despite being younger than them.
In Onegai My Melody, the antagonist Keiichi Hiiragi is shown to be a prodigy since his childhood, being a great violinist and being polite in many other things as well.
In Miraculous Ladybug, Félix Fathom is the youngest to graduate high school in England and is also noted to be a chess prodigy, as well as being a triple medalist in kung fu and horsemanship.

See also

 List of films about mathematicians

References

Prodigy